The acronym AADA may refer to:
 Advances in Adaptive Data Analysis, a publication by World Scientific
 "Anders als die Andern" (Different from the Others), first German movie about homosexuality
 American Academy of Dramatic Arts, a conservatory in New York
 American Autoduel Association, both a fictional organization in Car Wars and its official fan club
 Australian Academy of Dramatic Art, the former name of the Australian Institute of Music - Dramatic Arts theatre school in Sydney